Acropholis is an extinct genus of prehistoric bony fish that lived during the Permian epoch of Greenland.

References

Palaeonisciformes
Prehistoric ray-finned fish genera